Burgan-e Pain (also Romanized as Būrgān-e Pā’īn) is a village in Arabkhaneh Rural District, Shusef District, Nehbandan County, South Khorasan Province, Iran. At the 2006 census, its population was 36, in 9 families.

References 

Populated places in Nehbandan County